British Fencing (BF), formerly the British Fencing Association is the national governing body (NGB) for the Olympic sport of fencing in the British Isles (excluding the Republic of Ireland).

History
In 1902, the Amateur Fencing Association (AFA) was founded as the governing body for amateur fencing in the UK.  The requirements for amateurism have now been dissolved, and professionalism is permitted in the UK, so in 1996 the name was changed to the British Fencing Association. (A membership body for professional fencing coaches, the British Academy of Fencing, was not founded in its current form until 1949).

The AFA's had combined twin roles as both Home Country Governing Body for England and national governing body.  In 2002 in response to public funding frameworks, a new, separate body - England Fencing - was formed specifically to carry out the certain governing body activities for England.  Over time, the boundary between the two roles has eroded.

In recent years, the 'Association' changed its legal status, and the organisation became British Fencing.

In January 2011 British Fencing announced a five-year sponsorship deal worth £1 million with Beazley Group, the specialist Lloyd's insurer. Beazley was the principal sponsor – as well as the official insurer – of British Fencing until the end of 2015.

In 2016 a second major sponsor was announced, and Wilkinson Sword became British Fencing's new principal sponsor.

Activities of British Fencing
BF is responsible for all international fencing conducted while representing Great Britain. They control the selection criteria for all relevant competitions. They are responsible for any attendance by fencers at official FIE competitions, including the World Championships and World Cup competitions, and also at the Olympics under the IOC.

BF is also responsible for all national domestic events. It runs the British Fencing Championships in a variety of age categories and at all three weapons of fencing (foil, épée and sabre). BF licenses member clubs and competition organisers to run fencing competitions some of which earn participants ranking points. These points are used by the BFA to create national rankings at senior, junior (U20) and cadet (U17) level.

BF is responsible for ensuring that the sport has a robust governance structure, appropriately insured, and that those operating within the sport are appropriately qualified. It sets out the safety standards, rules and guidelines under which the sport operates, runs coaching schemes, and other activities relating to the promotion of fencing in the United Kingdom. In addition it runs a talent programme (funded by Sport England) to support young fencers (14-23) demonstrating motivation and capability to represent Great Britain. BF publishes a magazine, The Sword and collects membership fees on behalf of all the Home Country Associations - 40% of membership fees collected is passed to these associations.

Sponsorship
In December 2015, a five-year sponsorship deal worth £1million with Beazley Group, the specialist Lloyd's insurer came to an end. During that time the investment from Beazley helped fund Great Britain teams (including Paralympic hopefuls), The National Academy, programs for increased grassroots participation to the sport, British Fencing run events, including World Cup events as well as marketing and promotion of the sport.

BF is currently sponsored by Wilkinson Sword.

World Class Performance Programme
Until March 2017 BF operated a World Class Performance Programme (WCPP) which was a programme, funded by UK Sport, which helped British Fencing to fund those athletes who are likely to achieve podium success at the Olympic Games.

Under this programme, the Men's Foil Team qualified for Rio 2016 which was the first time that a Fencing team had qualified under the system introduced by the FIE 20 years ago. The team achieved sixth - narrowly losing to Russia, the eventual winners - and Richard Kruse came fourth in the individual event - the best Olympic results in decades.

In December 2016, UK Sport announced that they had withdrawn funding from fencing. In the funding review, Fencing was banded by UK Sport as Band 4. This means that Fencing was considered a 'possible' not 'probable' medal winning sport for Tokyo 2020. Along with all the other sports in Band 4, Fencing lost its WCP funding.

Rankings
Fencers are ranked by category (Cadet, Junior and Senior), weapon (foil, épée or sabre) and gender. Rankings are calculated from ranking points earned in competitions attended by the fencers. The number of points earned depends on the strength of the competition as well as how well the fencer did.

Governance
The Board of British Fencing (BF) is responsible for the overall governance, development and management of the sport of fencing in GB.  The Board sets the strategic direction of the sport, appoints the CEO and monitors progress and results.

The board consists of twelve board directors, of whom eight are elected and four appointed by the board (these four being the chair of the board and of British Fencing, an additional director and two independent directors).  The board's quorum rules specify that the elected members must always be in the majority.  In addition to these voting directors, board meetings are attended by the BF president and home country and athlete representatives.  Staff members attend some meetings, or parts of meetings, to brief/advise the Board.

Subdivisions
Under its auspices the six Home Nations (Wales, England, Northern Ireland, Guernsey, Jersey and Scotland) have their own governing bodies. The country is further subdivided into 'regions'.

Home nations governing bodies
 Welsh Fencing
 England Fencing
 Northern Ireland Fencing
 Guernsey Union d'Escrime
 Scottish Fencing

Regions
 East Midlands
 Eastern
 Guernsey
 Jersey
 London
 North East
 North West
 Northern Ireland
 Scotland Central
 Scotland East
 Scotland North
 Scotland West
 South East
 South West
 Southern
 Wales
 West Midlands
 Yorkshire

Notable British fencers

Administration
The British Fencing office is based at 1 Baron's Gate, 33-35 Rothschild Road, London W4 5HT. Its current Chief Executive is Georgina Usher.

See also
British National Fencing Museum

External links
 British Fencing
 Beazley British Fencing homepage
 Federation Internationale D'escrime
 BBC Sport - Fencing

References

Acton, London
Fencing in the United Kingdom
Fencing organizations
Great Britain
Organisations based in the London Borough of Ealing
Sport in the London Borough of Ealing
Fencing
1902 establishments in the United Kingdom